Šobec Campground is a campsite located  south of Highway E61 near Lesce, Slovenia.

The campsite lies next to Šobec Pond, a small artificial lake created by impounding a few inflows below the upper river terrace, where the southern part of Lesce is located. The pond was named after the Šobec farm, which stands nearby.

The campsite near the pond is in a pine forest next to the Sava Dolinka River. During the winter the campsite is closed, but it is nevertheless regularly visited by people from all over Europe because it is a popular starting point for hiking around the Upper Carniola region.

References

External links

Campsites in Slovenia
Municipality of Radovljica